Mandar is an Indian male given name, popular in the state of Maharashtra, which is one of the names of Lord Ganesha, and may also mean "coral tree" or "tree in heaven".

Mandar may refer to:

People with the given name 

 Mandar Chandwadkar (born 1976), Indian actor
 Mandar Madhukar Deshmukh (born 1974), Indian physicist 
 Mandar Rao Desai (born 1992), Indian football player

See also

References 

Indian given names